Gondal is one of the 182 Legislative Assembly constituencies of Gujarat state in India. It is part of Rajkot district and is a segment of Porbandar Lok Sabha constituency.

List of segments
This assembly seat represents the following segments,

 Gondal Taluka – Entire taluka except villages – Dadva Hamirpara, Karmal Kotda.

Members of Legislative Assembly

Election results

2022 
 

-->

2017

2012

2007

2002

1980
 Patel, Keshubhai Savdas (BJP) : 24,572 votes
 Bhalodi Nanjibhai Savjibhai (INC-I) : 16,995

See also
 List of constituencies of the Gujarat Legislative Assembly
 Rajkot district

References

Assembly constituencies of Gujarat
Rajkot district